Harness is an unincorporated community in Logan County, Illinois, United States. Harness is located west of Hartsburg and south of San Jose.

History
Harness was laid out in 1900 by Daniel R. Harness, and named for him.

References

Unincorporated communities in Logan County, Illinois
Unincorporated communities in Illinois